Sigurd Fougner (10 September 1879  – 1959) was a Norwegian judge.

He was born in Østre Gausdal to Frits Hansen and Ingeborg Marie Heftye, and was married to Dagny Collett, a sister of physician Arthur Collett. He graduated as cand.jur. in 1901, and was named as a Supreme Court Justice from 1938.

References

1879 births
1959 deaths
People from Gausdal
Supreme Court of Norway justices